80 South Street is a proposed residential skyscraper in the Financial District of Manhattan, New York City, that has been planned since the early 2000s. The original proposal for the skyscraper, released in 2003, was designed by renowned Spanish architect Santiago Calatrava, and was canceled in 2008 as a result of a declining real-estate market. A new shorter design was planned to be finished in 2016, and China Oceanwide Holdings Limited acquired 80 South Street in March 2016. However, following the collapse of Chinese real estate conglomerate Evergrande and associated contagion, in October 2021 China Oceanwide began marketing the property at an aggressive discount of more 190MM below its original acquisition cost in order to raise funds for its parent entity.

Site 
The site on which the building is planned to be constructed is occupied by a six-story red brick building. The existing building, including the side door entrance on Fletcher Street, was used as the set for API headquarters in the short-lived AMC series RUBICON, filmed in 2010.

Architecture

Original design 
The design of the building consisted of 12 four-story cubes stacked on top of one another, cantilevered off a central concrete column standing above an 8-story base. The slender concrete core would contain elevators, fire stairs and risers for plumbing and power. The base was intended to hold a cultural space, such as a museum. The lowest two cubes would hold offices, while the upper 10 cubes were planned to serve as individual residences. However, in 2014, Calatrava started a new design of 80 south street to propose for construction in New York City.

The tower was originally conceived as the 3rd-tallest building in New York City (after the Empire State Building and the Bank of America Tower).

2019 design 
Real estate blog New York YIMBY published a tentative design in April 2019. The design was based on plans by China Oceanwide Holdings Limited, which had already disengaged from the project and sold the building site. This plan would have had  of space, half residential and half commercial.

History 
The design for 80 South Street was first released to the public in 2003. Santiago Calatrava has stated that he took the idea for the building from a sculpture he created in 1985. 80 South Street received approval for construction from the City of New York in February 2005. The project was canceled in April 2008; the developer of the project listed the declining U.S. real estate market as a factor in its cancellation.

China Oceanwide Holdings Limited acquired 80 South Street in March 2016, with plans to create a 113-story tower. Demolition permits for 80 South Street and 163 Front Street were filed during early 2017. By 2018, work had stalled due to China Oceanwide's financial difficulties. The site was then listed for sale in early 2019; that June, China Oceanwide received a $175 million loan for the site.

See also 
City Tech Tower

References

External links 
80 South Street Project Website
Entry on Skyscraperpage.com
Entry on Emporis

Unbuilt buildings and structures in New York City
Financial District, Manhattan
Residential skyscrapers in Manhattan
Proposed buildings and structures in New York City
Proposed skyscrapers in the United States